Castle Loch is a shallow eutrophic loch covering an area of around 100 hectares in the town of Lochmaben in Dumfries and Galloway, Scotland. It lies to the west of Mochrum Loch and has 2 islets. The ruined Lochmaben Castle lies at the southern end of the loch.

Survey
The loch was surveyed in 1903 by James Murray and later charted  as part of Sir John Murray's Bathymetrical Survey of Fresh-Water Lochs of Scotland 1897-1909.

Wildlife and conservation
Castle Loch is an important over-wintering location for the pink-footed goose and the goosander. It has been recognised as a wetland of international importance under the Ramsar Convention, and has been designated a Site of Special Scientific Interest.

References

Lochs of Dumfries and Galloway
Freshwater lochs of Scotland
Ramsar sites in Scotland
Sites of Special Scientific Interest in Dumfries and Galloway
Wetlands of Scotland